Sunnyboys Real Live is the first live album by the Australian power pop group, Sunnyboys. It was recorded in June 1984 and released in November 1984 on Mushroom Records.

Background
Following the release of Get Some Fun in April 1984, the group supported The Police and by June, the Sunnyboys announced they were disbanding: internal dissent and the pressure and stress of industry expectation being cited as the reasons for the break-up. 
The group's performance in Sydney's Chevron Hotel and Maroubra Seal Club in June 1984 were released in November 1984. A final national tour at Sydney’s Graphic Arts Club on 23 and 24 December were sell-outs.

Track listing

Release history

References 

1984 live albums
Sunnyboys albums
Mushroom Records albums